SS Michael de Kovats was a Liberty ship built in the United States during World War II. She was named after Michael de Kovats, a Hungarian nobleman and cavalry officer who served in the Continental Army during the American Revolutionary War, in which he was killed in action. General Casimir Pulaski and Kovats are together known as the "Founding Fathers of the US Cavalry."

Construction
Michael de Kovats was laid down on 8 August 1944, under a Maritime Commission (MARCOM) contract, MC hull 2495, by the St. Johns River Shipbuilding Company, Jacksonville, Florida; she was sponsored by Mrs. Daniels Brierley, the wife of the director of the division of maintenance and repairs MARCOM, Washington, DC, and was launched on 16 September 1944.

History
She was allocated to the Polarus Steamship Co., on 27 September 1944. On 2 June 1948, she was laid up in the National Defense Reserve Fleet, Mobile, Alabama. She was sold for scrapping, 22 February 1972, to Pinto Island Metals Co., for $37,500. She was removed from the fleet, 6 March 1972.

References

Bibliography

 
 
 
 

 

Liberty ships
Ships built in Jacksonville, Florida
1944 ships
Mobile Reserve Fleet